Pasandarreh (also known as Pīsh Darreh and Pish Qal‘eh) is a village in Gifan Rural District, Garmkhan District, Bojnord County, North Khorasan Province, Iran. At the 2006 census, its population was 248, in 55 families.

References 

Populated places in Bojnord County